is a passenger railway station located in the city of Kuwana, Mie Prefecture, Japan, operated by the private railway operator Sangi Railway.

Lines
Ariyoshi Station is served by the Hokusei Line, and is located 4.1 kilometres from the terminus of the line at Nishi-Kuwana Station.

Layout
The station consists of a single unnumbered island platform connected to the station building by a level crossing. The station is unattended.

Platforms

Adjacent stations

History
Ariyoshi Station was opened on April 5, 1914, as a station on the Hokusei Railway, which became the Hokusei Electric Railway on June 27, 1934. Through a series of mergers, the line became part of the Kintetsu network by April 1, 1965, but was spun out as an independent company on April 1, 2003. A new station building was completed on December 27, 2006.

Passenger statistics
In fiscal 2019, the station was used by an average of 166 passengers daily (boarding passengers only).

Surrounding area
Japan National Route 421

See also
List of railway stations in Japan

References

External links

Sangi Railway official home page

Railway stations in Japan opened in 1914
Railway stations in Mie Prefecture
Kuwana, Mie